Eduardo Rosa dos Santos or simply Eduardo Arroz (born May 4, 1981, in Itaporã), is a Brazilian right back. He currently plays for Sete de Dourados.

Honours  
 Santa Cruz
 Campeonato Pernambucano: 2011, 2012

 Aparecidense
 Campeonato Goiano Série B: 2014

Sete de Dourados
 Campeonato Sul-Mato-Grossense: 2016

External links

 

1981 births
Living people
Brazilian footballers
Brazilian expatriate footballers
Association football forwards
Campeonato Brasileiro Série A players
Campeonato Brasileiro Série B players
Campeonato Brasileiro Série C players
Campeonato Brasileiro Série D players
Ituano FC players
Clube Atlético Sorocaba players
América Futebol Clube (RN) players
Marília Atlético Clube players
Associação Atlética Ponte Preta players
Santa Cruz Futebol Clube players
Mirassol Futebol Clube players
Associação Atlética Aparecidense players
Guaratinguetá Futebol players
Treze Futebol Clube players
Operário Futebol Clube (MS) players